Law & Order is an American police procedural and legal drama television series created by Dick Wolf and produced by Wolf Entertainment, launching the Law & Order franchise. 

Law & Order aired its entire run on NBC, premiering on September 13, 1990, and completing its 20th season on May 24, 2010. On September 28, 2021, after an 11-year hiatus, NBC announced that the series would be revived for a 21st season, which premiered on February 24, 2022. The revival saw the debut of new regular cast members and the reprisal of District Attorney Jack McCoy and Detective Kevin Bernard by series veterans Sam Waterston and Anthony Anderson, respectively. On May 10, 2022, the series was renewed by NBC for a 22nd season, which premiered on September 22, 2022.

Set and filmed in New York City, the series follows a two-part approach: the first half-hour is the investigation of a crime (usually murder) and apprehension of a suspect by New York City Police Department detectives; the second half is the prosecution of the defendant by the Manhattan District Attorney's Office. Plots are often based on real cases that recently made headlines, although the motivation for the crime and the perpetrator may be different.

The show started using revolving-door casting in season 2. Among the longest-running main cast members were Steven Hill as District Attorney Adam Schiff (seasons 1–10), Jerry Orbach as Detective Lennie Briscoe (seasons 3–14), S. Epatha Merkerson as Lieutenant Anita Van Buren (seasons 4–20), Sam Waterston as Executive Assistant District Attorney Jack McCoy (seasons 5 – present; later District Attorney), and Jesse L. Martin as Detective Ed Green (seasons 10–18).

Law & Orders 22 seasons are second only to its spin-off Law & Order: Special Victims Unit (1999–present) for the longest-running live-action scripted American primetime series. The success of the series has led to the creation of additional shows, making Law & Order a franchise, with a television film, several video games, and international adaptations of the series. It has won and has been nominated for numerous awards over the years, including a number of Emmy Awards.

Production

History and development
In 1988, Dick Wolf developed a concept for a new television series that would depict a relatively optimistic picture of the American criminal justice system. He initially toyed with the idea of calling it Night & Day but then hit upon the title Law & Order. The first half of each episode would follow two detectives (a senior and a junior detective) and their commanding officer as they investigate a violent crime.

The second half of the episode would follow the District Attorney's Office and the courts as two prosecutors, with advice from the District Attorney, attempt to convict the accused. Through this, Law & Order would be able to investigate some of the larger issues of the day by focusing on stories that were based on real cases making headlines.

Wolf took the idea to then-president of Universal Television Kerry McCluggage, who pointed out the similarity to a 1963 series titled Arrest and Trial, which lasted one season. The two watched the pilot of that series, in which a police officer (Ben Gazzara) arrested a man for armed robbery in the first half, and the defense attorney, played by Chuck Connors, gets the perpetrator off as the wrong guy in the second half; this was the formula of the show every week.

Wolf decided that, while his detectives would occasionally also be fallible, he wanted a fresh approach to the genre, to go from police procedural to prosecution with a greater degree of realism. In addition, the prosecution would be the hero, a reversal of the usual formula in lawyer dramas.

Initially, Fox ordered 13 episodes based on the concept alone, with no pilot. Then-network head Barry Diller reversed the decision. Although he loved the idea, he didn't believe it was a "Fox show." Wolf then went to CBS, which ordered a pilot, "Everybody's Favorite Bagman", written by Wolf about corrupt city officials involved with the mob. The network liked the pilot but did not order it because there were no breakout stars.

In the summer of 1989, NBC's top executives, Brandon Tartikoff and Warren Littlefield, screened the pilot and liked it; but they were concerned the intensity of the series could not be repeated week after week. However, by 1990, NBC executives had enough confidence that the innovative show could appeal to a wide audience that they ended up ordering the series for a full season.

Filming
The series was shot on location in New York City and is known for its extensive use of local color. The sets were located at Chelsea Piers. In early episodes courtroom scenes were shot at Tweed Courthouse before a courtroom set was built.
In later seasons, New York City mayors Rudy Giuliani and Michael Bloomberg, attorney William Kunstler and Bronx Congressman José Serrano all appeared on the show as themselves.

Local personalities also had recurring cameos as fictional characters, such as Donna Hanover and Fran Lebowitz as judges. On September 14, 2004, in New York City, a road leading to Pier 62 at Chelsea Piers (where the series was mostly shot) was renamed "Law & Order Way" in tribute to the series.

Music and sound effects

The music for Law & Order was composed by veteran composer Mike Post, and was deliberately designed to be minimal to match the abbreviated style of the series. Post wrote the theme song using electric piano, guitar, and clarinet. In addition, scene changes were accompanied by a tone generated by Post.  He refers to the tone as "The Clang", while Entertainment Weekly critic Ken Tucker has referred to the sound as the "ominous chung CHUNG", actor Dann Florek (in a promo) as the "doink doink", and Richard Belzer as "the Dick Wolf Cash Register Sound".

According to Allan, 2021:

"The tone moves the viewer from scene to scene, jumping forward in time with all the importance and immediacy of a judge's gavel – which is exactly what Post was aiming for when he created it. While reminiscent of a jail door slamming..."

"...it is actually an amalgamation of 'six or seven' sounds, including the sound made by 500 Japanese men walking across a hardwood floor." The sound has become so associated with the Law & Order brand that it was also carried over to other series of the franchise.

The UK-aired Channel Five versions of seasons 7–16 of Law & Order feature the song "I'm Not Driving Anymore" by Rob Dougan in the opening credits, while seasons 17–20 used the US theme.

Casting and characters

Pilot
For the 1988 pilot, George Dzundza and Chris Noth were cast as the original detectives, Sergeant Max Greevey and Detective Mike Logan. The producers felt that Dzundza would be a perfect senior police officer as he was someone the producers felt they could see themselves riding along with in a police cruiser. Noth and Michael Madsen were candidates for the role of Logan. Madsen initially was considered the perfect choice for the role, but, in a final reading, it was felt that Madsen's acting mannerisms were repetitive, and Noth received the role instead. Rounding out the police cast, Dann Florek was cast as Captain Donald Cragen.

On the prosecutor's side, Michael Moriarty was Dick Wolf's choice to play Executive Assistant District Attorney Benjamin "Ben" Stone. The network, however, preferred James Naughton, but, in the end, Wolf's choice would prevail, and Moriarty received the role. As his A.D.A., Richard Brooks and Eriq La Salle were being considered for the role of Paul Robinette. The network favored La Salle but, once again, the producers' choice prevailed, and Brooks received the role. As their boss, Roy Thinnes was cast as District Attorney Alfred Wentworth.

Seasons 1–3
Nearly two years passed between the pilot and production of the series. The producers held options on Dzundza, Noth, Moriarty and Brooks. Each was paid holding money for the additional year and brought back. Florek also returned. Thinnes, however, was starring in Dark Shadows and declined to return. In his place, the producers tapped Steven Hill to play District Attorney Adam Schiff, a character loosely based on real-life New York County District Attorney Robert Morgenthau. Hill brought prestige and experience to the show, and as such, the producers allowed Hill to give insight on the direction he thought the character should go.

Dzundza was disappointed when he realized that the show would be more of an ensemble show rather than a show starring him. Though the cast liked his performance, they increasingly felt uncomfortable around Dzundza, who was also under stress due to the constant commute between New York City and his home in Los Angeles. Dzundza quit after only one season on the show, and Sergeant Greevey was written off as being killed in the line of duty.

He was replaced by Paul Sorvino as Sergeant Phil Cerreta, who was considered more even tempered than either Dzundza's Greevey or Mike Logan. Sorvino was initially excited about the role, but would leave midway through the next season, citing the exhausting schedule demanded by the filming of the show, a need to broaden his horizons, and the desire to preserve his vocal cords for singing opera as reasons for leaving the show. Sergeant Cerreta was written off as having been shot in the line of duty and transferring to a desk job at another precinct.

To replace Sorvino on the series, Wolf cast Jerry Orbach (who had previously guest starred as a defense attorney Frank Lehrman in the season 2 episode "The Wages of Love") in the role of Detective Leonard W. "Lennie" Briscoe. Orbach's characterization of the world-weary, wisecracking Detective Briscoe was based on a similar NYPD character he portrayed in the 1981 film Prince of the City, which Wolf had personally requested Orbach to replicate for the show.

Introduced on a recurring basis during season 2 was Carolyn McCormick as Dr. Elizabeth Olivet, a police psychologist brought in on a case-by-case basis. NBC had been pushing for the producers to add female characters to the all-male cast. She was added to the opening credits as "also starring" in Season 3 and 4 but, despite the attempts of the producers to include her in as many episodes as possible, it was found to be difficult to incorporate her into the show due to the format leaning heavily on the police and prosecutors. She was removed from the credits in Season 5.

McCormick stayed with the show on a recurring basis, but believed that the character had become less profound and complex, and that her role had been reduced mostly to "psychobabble". She left to star on Cracker after season 7.  After the cancellation of Cracker, she returned beginning in season 13 and appeared occasionally until season 20.

Seasons 4–7
By the end of season 3, NBC executives still felt the show did not have enough female characters. On the orders of then-network president Warren Littlefield, new female characters had to be added to the cast or the show would face possible cancellation on its relegated Friday night time slot. Wolf realized that, since there were only six characters on the show, someone had to be dismissed. He chose to dismiss Florek and Brooks from the regular roster, and later said it was the hardest two phone calls he had ever made. Though producers initially claimed the firings, especially that of Brooks, who was said not to get along with Moriarty, were for other reasons, Wolf confirmed that the firings were on the orders of Littlefield.

To replace Florek, S. Epatha Merkerson was cast as new squad leader Lieutenant Anita Van Buren. (Merkerson had previously guest starred as a mother of a gunshot victim in the season 1 episode "Mushrooms".) To replace Brooks, Jill Hennessy was cast as Assistant District Attorney Claire Kincaid. Though no initial explanation was given on the show for the departures of Florek's or Brooks's characters, they would both later return in guest appearances, with Captain Cragen having been reassigned to the Internal Affairs Bureau and A.D.A. Robinette having become a defense attorney. Florek also returned to direct a few episodes, and his character was eventually added to the cast of Law & Order: Special Victims Unit.

Meanwhile, Moriarty's behavior both on and off the set became problematic for Wolf. After a public statement in which Moriarty called Attorney General Janet Reno a "psychopathic Nazi" for her efforts to censor television violence, Moriarty engaged in a verbal confrontation with Reno at a dinner in Washington, D.C. Wolf asked Moriarty to tone down his comments, and Moriarty responded by quitting the show the next week. This could have been caused by his drinking, as he admits to being "a very bad drunk" before going on the wagon in February 2004. The final storyline for Ben Stone involves his resignation over guilt after a woman he compelled to testify against a Russian mobster was murdered by his cohorts. To replace Moriarty, Sam Waterston was Wolf's first choice for the role of Executive Assistant District Attorney John James "Jack" McCoy Jr.; Waterston's character was markedly different from Moriarty's in that Jack McCoy was conceived as more emotionally stable and having more sex appeal.

Wolf dismissed Noth when his contract expired at the end of season 5, because he felt that Lennie Briscoe and Mike Logan had become too similar to each other and the writers were having difficulty in writing their dialogue together. Furthermore, Noth had been disgruntled with the show since the dismissals of Florek and Brooks, and remained embittered against Wolf, who he felt was not a friend to his actors. The final storyline for Detective Logan involved his banishment to work on Staten Island in a domestic violence crimes unit as punishment for punching a city council member who had orchestrated the murder of a gay colleague and had managed to get acquitted of the charges. (The made-for-television film Exiled: A Law & Order Movie, in which Noth starred, centers on Logan's attempt to get back into the department's good graces.) Noth was replaced by Benjamin Bratt as Detective Reynaldo "Rey" Curtis, who was hired in an attempt to find an actor even sexier than Noth to join the cast.

Hennessy chose not to renew her three-year contract at the end of season 6 to pursue other projects, and Claire Kincaid was written off as being killed in a drunk driving accident. She was replaced by Carey Lowell as Assistant District Attorney Jamie Ross. Lowell remained with the show until the end of season 8, when she left to spend more time with her daughter. (Jamie Ross was written off as leaving the D.A.'s office for similar reasons.) Lowell (who later returned for a couple of guest appearances) was replaced by Angie Harmon as Assistant District Attorney Abigail "Abbie" Carmichael, who was conceived as being much louder and outspoken than any of her predecessors. Harmon auditioned with 85 other women, including Vanessa Williams, for the role, and was picked after Wolf heard her Texas accent.

Seasons 8–14
Beginning in season 8 (1997), J. K. Simmons had the recurring role of Dr. Emil Skoda, a psychiatrist who worked with the Police Department. He appeared in 41 episodes until 2004. He then reappeared for three episodes in season 20.

Bratt left the series at the end of season 9, stating it was an amicable departure and he expected to eventually return for guest appearances. (He ultimately returned for the season 20 episode "Fed".) Detective Curtis was written off as leaving the force in order to take care of his wife, who was suffering from multiple sclerosis, in her final days. He was replaced by Jesse L. Martin as Detective Ed Green, who was conceived of as more of a loose cannon in the mold of Noth's Logan than Bratt's Curtis was. (Briscoe was described as being a recovering alcoholic, as Cragen had been; Green was described as being a recovering compulsive gambler.) In 2000, Steven Hill announced he was leaving the series after season 10. Hill, who was the last remaining member of the original cast, said his departure was mutual with the producers. He was replaced by Dianne Wiest as Interim District Attorney Nora Lewin, and Adam Schiff was written out off-screen as departing to work with Jewish charities and human-rights organizations in Europe.

The following year, Harmon left the show after three seasons (with Abbie Carmichael written off as being called on to serve the U.S. Attorney's office) and was replaced by Elisabeth Röhm as Assistant District Attorney Serena Southerlyn. The year after that, Wiest left the show after two seasons and was replaced by retiring U.S. Senator Fred Thompson as District Attorney Arthur Branch, whose character was conceived of as being much more right-leaning than his predecessors in the D.A.'s office, and was a direct reaction to the September 11 attacks. No mention was made on the show of what happened to Nora Lewin, though producers said her character was only supposed to be an interim D.A.

Seasons 15 & 16
After 12 years on Law & Order, Orbach announced in March 2004 that he was leaving the show at the end of season 14 for the spin-off Law & Order: Trial by Jury. Lennie Briscoe was written off as retiring from the NYPD and later taking a position as an investigator for the D.A.'s office. He was replaced at the 27th Precinct by Detective Joe Fontana, played by Dennis Farina. At the time, Orbach would not state the reason for his departure, but it was eventually revealed that he had been battling prostate cancer (for over 10 years) and that his role on Trial by Jury was designed to be less taxing on him than his role on the original series was. However, Orbach died from his cancer on December 28, 2004, and was featured in only the first two episodes of Trial by Jury. (His character was subsequently written off as having also died off-screen, though this was not revealed on the original series until the season 18 episode "Burn Card".)

Season 15 would see the departure of Röhm mid-season. Röhm's final scene on the show, in the episode "Ain't No Love", sparked controversy within the fanbase, as A.D.A. Southerlyn asked Arthur Branch if she was being fired because she was a lesbian, a fact the scripts had never even hinted at until then. Wolf said Röhm's departure was unexpected, and she exited the show in January 2005. For a few seasons, she had often argued opposing points to McCoy and Branch, and he thought she would be better as a defender rather than a prosecutor. Her replacement was Annie Parisse as Assistant District Attorney Alexandra Borgia.

Later that season, Martin departed early to film Rent. Ed Green was temporarily written off as being shot in the line of duty and being replaced during his recovery by Detective Nick Falco, played by Michael Imperioli, who had previously guest starred as a murder suspect in the season 6 episode "Atonement". Parisse left the series at the end of season 16 (with A.D.A. Borgia written off as being murdered), and Farina announced shortly afterward that he too was leaving Law & Order to pursue other projects. (Detective Fontana was written off as having retired off-screen.)

Seasons 17–20
By this point, NBC executives believed the series was beginning to show its age, as the ratings had been declining since Orbach's departure. Farina had never been popular with fans when he replaced Orbach, and it was felt that the cast just did not seem to mesh well together anymore. In an effort to revitalize the show, Wolf replaced Parisse with Alana de la Garza as Assistant District Attorney Consuela "Connie" Rubirosa, while Martin's Green was promoted to senior detective and partnered with Detective Nina Cassady, played by Milena Govich, who had worked with Wolf on the short-lived series Conviction and served as the show's first female detective of the main cast. She also briefly appeared as a bartender in the season 16 episode titled "Flaw".

However, Govich proved to be even more unpopular with fans than her predecessor was and left the show after one season with the explanation being that Detective Cassady's assignment to the precinct had been temporary and had been transferred out. She was replaced by Jeremy Sisto, who had previously guest starred as a defense attorney in the season 17 episode "The Family Hour", as Detective Cyrus Lupo. Around the same time, Thompson announced he would leave the show to seek the 2008 Republican presidential nomination. (No explanation was given within the show regarding Arthur Branch's off-screen departure.) Waterston's character was promoted to Interim District Attorney (later made full District Attorney in season 20) and his former position was filled in by Executive Assistant District Attorney Michael Cutter, played by Linus Roache.

Martin later announced that he would leave the show for the second and last time near the end of season 18 to pursue other endeavors, and Detective Green was written off as resigning from the force due to burnout. He was replaced by Anthony Anderson as Detective Kevin Bernard. In 2010, Merkerson announced that she would leave the show at the end of season 20, with Lieutenant Van Buren given a season-long story arc involving her battling cervical cancer. However, the cancellation of the show rendered this moot.

Season 21–present
In Deadline Hollywood, Nellie Andreeva announced the series was returning. On November 1, 2021, Jeffrey Donovan was cast as a series regular to portray a New York Police Department detective, later revealed as Frank Cosgrove. At that time it was also reported that Sam Waterston and Anthony Anderson, who starred in earlier seasons of the series, and additional former cast members were also in talks to return. Waterston previously stated in 2015 that he would be open to returning. Other previous cast members including S. Epatha Merkerson, Jeremy Sisto and Alana de la Garza hold starring roles on Chicago Med and FBI, respectively, with both also being part of the franchise and Wolf Entertainment series. On November 23, 2021, it was announced that Hugh Dancy had been cast as an assistant district attorney and that Anderson had signed a one-year deal to return as Detective Kevin Bernard. On December 10, 2021, it was revealed that Camryn Manheim had been cast as Lieutenant Kate Dixon, the successor to Merkerson's character, Lieutenant Anita Van Buren. Manheim portrayed minor characters in previous seasons of the series. In December 2021, Odelya Halevi was added to the cast as Assistant District Attorney Samantha Maroun. A day later, Waterston was announced to have finalized a one-year deal to return as District Attorney Jack McCoy.

On May 10, 2022, the series was renewed by NBC for a 22nd season. Later that same month, it was announced that Anderson would leave the series. On June 7, Waterston signed a new deal to return for the 22nd season, making him the longest-running cast member of the series. A week later, Mehcad Brooks joined the cast in the new season, replacing Anderson.

"Ripped from the headlines"
Often, the plot of an initial portion of an episode resembles a recognizable aspect of an actual case.

Some real-life crime victims have felt used and exploited, with one lawyer, Ravi Batra, going so far as to sue the show in 2004 for libel with regard to the season 14 episode "Floater", which portrayed a lawyer with a similar name and the distinctive features of Batra. Batra and the show later settled out of court for an unspecified amount.

Episodes

Law & Order premiered September 13, 1990, and aired on NBC, with 456 episodes having been produced.

Broadcast history

Broadcast 
The show premiered September 13, 1990, and ended its first run on May 24, 2010. 456 episodes were aired and produced. The show ran for twenty seasons on NBC. At this time, it was NBC's longest running crime drama, and tied for longest running primetime scripted drama with Gunsmoke. The first two seasons were broadcast Tuesdays at 10 p.m. From season 3 through 16 the show aired Wednesday at 10 p.m. For season 17 it moved to Fridays at 10 p.m. For seasons 18 and 19 the show shifted back to Wednesdays at 10 p.m. For season 20 the show was broadcast Fridays at 8 p.m., while in the spring it moved to Mondays at 10 p.m., where it broadcast its initial series finale on May 24, 2010. The revival (Season 21-present) now airs as part of NBC's 'Law & Order Thursday' lineup broadcasting Thursdays at 8 p.m. since February 24, 2022.

Syndication and streaming
Repeats of Law & Order were first broadcast weekdays on cable TV network A&E during the 1995–96 season. The A&E broadcasts were credited with drawing a new, much larger audience to the current weekly NBC Law & Order episodes. In 2002, A&E did not renew its contract to syndicate Law & Order as the price was then four times the original 1995 contract price.
As of 2023, the series is being broadcast on Sundance TV, TNT, WE tv, NewsNation, Ion Mystery, BBC America, Bounce TV and Paramount Network.

Since mid-2020, selected seasons of Law & Order have been available for streaming on Peacock along with Chicago Fire, Chicago P.D., Chicago Med, Law & Order: Special Victims Unit, and Law & Order: Criminal Intent.  However, unlike some shows on Peacock such as selected seasons of SVU, which are free, access to Law & Order requires a paid Peacock subscription.

Reception

Ratings

Cancellation and revival
On May 14, 2010, NBC officially canceled Law & Order, opting instead to pick up Law & Order: Los Angeles as a series and renew Law & Order: Special Victims Unit for a twelfth season.  Creator Dick Wolf continued to pressure the series' producer NBCUniversal to make a deal with TNT, which held syndication rights to the show, for a twenty-first season if an acceptable license fee could be negotiated. Talks between the two started up after upfronts. However, TNT said in a statement it was not interested in picking the show up for a new season.

After TNT discussions fell through, cable network AMC also considered reviving Law & Order; however, attempts to revive it failed, and according to creator Dick Wolf, the series "moved into the history books".

In February 2015, NBC considered bringing the series back for a 10-episode limited series.

On September 28, 2021, NBC announced that a 21st season had been ordered. The new season was announced after plans for a new Law & Order spin-off, For the Defense, had fallen through during the summer. On November 1, 2021, it was announced that Jeffrey Donovan was cast as a new series regular, while Sam Waterston and Anthony Anderson would later be announced to return. On November 12, 2021, it was announced that the 21st season will premiere on February 24, 2022.

On November 23, 2021, it was announced that Hugh Dancy would join the cast for the 21st season, and it was confirmed that Anthony Anderson would reprise his role as Detective Kevin Bernard.

On December 10, 2021, it was revealed that Camryn Manheim had been cast as Lieutenant Kate Dixon, the successor to Merkerson's character, Lieutenant Anita Van Buren. Manheim portrayed minor characters in previous seasons of the series. On December 15, 2021, Odelya Halevi was announced to be joining the cast as Assistant District Attorney Samantha Maroun. A day later, Waterston was announced to have finalized a one-year deal to return as District Attorney Jack McCoy. Law & Order officially aired its first new episode in almost 12 years on February 24, 2022.

On May 10, 2022, NBC renewed the series for a twenty-second season. One week after the twenty-first season ended, On May 26, 2022, it was confirmed that Anderson would not be returning for the twenty-second season. On June 7, 2022, it was announced that Waterston would reprise his role as McCoy for the twenty-second season. On June 13, 2022, it was reported that Mehcad Brooks was cast for the twenty-second season.

Spin-offs, crossovers, and adaptations

The longevity and success of Law & Order have spawned six American television series (Law & Order: Special Victims Unit, Law & Order: Criminal Intent, Law & Order: Trial by Jury, Law & Order: Los Angeles, Law & Order True Crime, and Law & Order: Organized Crime) as well as a television film (Exiled: A Law & Order Movie). The commercial potential of the Law & Order name outweighed initial fears that failed spin-offs (such as Trial by Jury and Los Angeles) could erode the audience of the original series. To differentiate it from other series in the franchise, Law & Order is often referred to as "The Mother Ship" by producers and critics.

Law & Order has had crossover episodes with other series in its franchise. Additionally, it crossed over with New York Undercover and Conviction; while neither series belongs to the Law & Order franchise officially, both are part of its fictional universe, and were also created by Wolf. It also had several crossover episodes with Homicide: Life on the Street. Law & Orders success has spawned two other external franchises that co-exist in the same universe (Chicago and FBI). The Chicago and L&O were connected through Chicago Fire and Chicago P.D. with crossovers between SVU. Chicago P.D. also had crossovers with FBI.

The series has been adapted for British television as Law & Order: UK, with the setting being changed to London.

Awards and honors

Law & Order has been nominated for numerous awards in the television industry over the span of its run. 

Among its wins are the 1997 Primetime Emmy Award for Outstanding Drama Series, Screen Actors Guild Awards for Outstanding Male Actor in a Drama Series for Sam Waterston in 1999 and Jerry Orbach in 2005 (awarded after his death), and numerous Edgar Awards for Best Episode in a Television Series Teleplay.

In 2002, Law & Order was ranked #24 on TV Guide's 50 Greatest TV Shows of All Time. The show also placed #27 on Entertainment Weekly "New TV Classics" list.

In 2013, TV Guide ranked Law & Order #14 on their list of the 60 Greatest Shows of All Time.

Home media
A box set titled Law & Order Producer's Collection was released on VHS in 2000. The 3-tape set included six episodes of the series.

Universal Studios has released fourteen seasons on DVD in Region 1, along with the complete series. Law & Order: The Complete Series boxed set features all 20 seasons. Each season is individually packaged (in tray-stack style), with all new cover-art (including new cover art for the seasons that have been released). The set also includes a 50-page full-color book titled "The Episode Guide". Along with episode names and synopsis, there is trivia, facts about the making of the show, liner notes, and over 80 full-color photos. In Region 2, Universal Playback has released the first seven seasons on DVD in the UK. In Region 4, Universal Pictures has released all 20 seasons on DVD in Australia and New Zealand.

The DVD box set is all NTSC even though the show switched to ATSC in season 15.

See also
 List of police television dramas

References

Citations

General and cited references

External links

  on Wolf Entertainment
  on NBC
  on TNT
  on Channel 5
 Official Website on City in Canada
 Law & Order filming locations, Mayor's Office of Film, Theater and Broadcasting
 
 

•
1990s American crime drama television series
2000s American crime drama television series
2010s American crime drama television series
2020s American crime drama television series
1990s American legal television series
2000s American legal television series
2010s American legal television series
2020s American legal television series
1990s American mystery television series
2000s American mystery television series
2010s American mystery television series
2020s American mystery television series
1990s American police procedural television series
2000s American police procedural television series
2010s American police procedural television series
2020s American police procedural television series
1990 American television series debuts
2010 American television series endings
2022 American television series debuts
American legal drama television series
American television series revived after cancellation
Edgar Award-winning works
English-language television shows
Fictional portrayals of the New York City Police Department
NBC original programming
New York Supreme Court
Peabody Award-winning television programs
Primetime Emmy Award for Outstanding Drama Series winners
Primetime Emmy Award-winning television series
Television series by Universal Television
Television shows set in New York City
Television shows filmed in New York City
Television series created by Dick Wolf
Television series by Wolf Films
Television series based on actual events
Television shows featuring audio description
Television series about prosecutors